Scratchbox 2 (often abbreviated to "sb2" or "sbox2") is a cross-compilation toolkit designed to make embedded Linux application development easier.  It also provides a full set of tools to integrate and cross-compile an entire Linux distribution.

In the Linux world, when building software, many parameters are auto-detected on the host system (like installed libraries and system configuration), for example through Autotools' ./configure scripts.  When one wants to build software for an embedded target by cross-compilation, most auto-detected parameters are incorrect: I.e., host configuration is not the same as the embedded target's configuration.

Without Scratchbox 2, one has to manually set many parameters and "hack" the "configure" process to be able to generate code for the embedded target.

Scratchbox 2 allows one to set up a "virtual" environment that will trick the Autotools and executables into thinking that they are directly running on the embedded target with its configuration.

Moreover, Scratchbox 2 provides a technology called CPU-transparency that goes further: With CPU-transparency, executables built for the host CPU or for the target CPU could be executed directly on the host with sb2 handling the task to emulate a different CPU-architecture if necessary to run software components compiled for the target CPU.  Hence a build process can mix using programs built for different CPU-architectures.  That is especially useful when a build process requires building a software component X first as a build dependency for building software component Y: For example, a "Lexer" has to by built first in order to generate code for / of another software component.

Projects using Scratchbox 2
 Tizen
 Maemo
 MeeGo / Mer
 Sailfish OS
 WIDK − WebOS Internals Development Kit
 Raspberry Pi (used to build binaries for the Raspberry Pi alpha board)

References

External links
 Scratchbox 2 documentation
 Archive of the original Scratchbox 2 website

Embedded Linux
Build automation